Events from the year 1762 in art.

Events
 Trevi Fountain in Rome is completed after thirty years of work, with Nicola Salvi's design being modified by Giovanni Paolo Panini.
 The art collection of Joseph Smith, former British consul in Venice, including many works by Canaletto, is sold to King George III of Great Britain for the Royal Collection.
 James Stuart and Nicholas Revett's Antiquities of Athens is published.
 Horace Walpole begins publication of Anecdotes of Painting in England, based on George Vertue's manuscript notes.

Paintings

Thomas Davies – An East View of the Great Cataract of Niagara
François-Hubert Drouais – Portrait of Dmitry Mikhaylovich Golitsyn
Nathaniel Hone – Portrait of Lieutenant-General the Hon Philip Sherard and Captain William Tiffin at the Battle of Brücke-Mühl
Allan Ramsay – Portraits of George III of Great Britain; Queen Charlotte; and the Countess of Elgin
Joshua Reynolds – Portraits of Sir Charles Spencer; the Earl of Shaftesbury; Emma, Lady Edgcumbe; and Ostenaco, Mankiller of Keowee
George Stubbs (some dates approximate)
Lion Attacking a Horse (two versions)
Mare and Foals belonging to the 2nd Viscount Bolingbroke
Mare and Foals with an unfigured background
The Marquess of Rockingham's Scrub with John Singleton up
Molly Longlegs with a jockey
Scrub, a horse belonging to the Marquess of Rockingham
Whistlejacket
Whistlejacket with the head groom Mr Cobb and the two other principal stallions in the Wentworth stud
Johann Zoffany
The Garden at Hampton House, with Mr and Mrs David Garrick taking tea
The Shakespeare Temple at Hampton House, with Mr and Mrs David Garrick

Births
February 29 – Eberhard Wächter, painter (died 1852)
June 16 – Giuseppe Bernardino Bison, Italian painter, especially of history pieces, genre depictions, and whimsical and imaginary landscapes (died 1844)
August 10 – Arthur William Devis – English portrait and historical painter (died 1822)
October 4 – William Sawrey Gilpin, watercolour painter (died 1843)
December 30 – John Emes, British engraver and water-colour painter (died 1810)
date unknown
Pierre-Michel Alix, French engraver (died 1817)
James Bisset, Scottish-born artist, manufacturer, writer, collector, art dealer and poet (died 1832)
Giovanni Battista Ballanti, sculptor (died 1835)
Vicente Calderón de la Barca, Spanish historical painter (died 1794)
Pietro Fontana, Italian engraver (died 1837)
Anna Rajecka, Polish painter and drawing artist (died 1832)
Francesco Rosaspina, Italian engraver (died 1841)
Jan Rustem, Turkish-born portrait painter (died 1835)
William Frederick Wells, English watercolour painter and etcher (died 1836)

Deaths
 January 11 – Louis-François Roubiliac, French sculptor (born 1695)
 April 2 – Johann Georg Bergmüller, painter of frescoes (born 1688)
 July 16 – Giovanni Francesco Braccioli, Italian painter, mainly active in Ferrara (born 1698)
 July 20 – Paul Troger, Austrian painter, draughtsman and printmaker of the late Baroque period (born 1698)
 July 27 – Edmé Bouchardon, French sculptor (born 1698)
 August 31 – Pietro Rotari, Italian painter of portraits and altarpieces (born 1707)
 October 22 – Karl Aigen, German painter, master painter/tutor with Daniel Gran in Vienna (born 1684)
 November 18 – Agostino Veracini, Italian painter and engraver (born 1689)
 date unknown
 Joseph Antony Adolph, Moravian painter (born 1729)
 Jean-Baptiste Gilles,  French painter of portraits in miniature and water-colours (born 1680)
 Andreas Møller, Danish portrait painter and pioneer of miniature painting (born 1684)
 Lars Pinnerud, Norwegian farmer and woodcarver (born 1700)

References 

 
Years of the 18th century in art
1760s in art